The 1992 All-Ireland Minor Football Championship was the 61st staging of the All-Ireland Minor Football Championship, the Gaelic Athletic Association's premier inter-county Gaelic football tournament for boys under the age of 18.

Cork entered the championship as defending champions, however, they were defeated by Meath in the All-Ireland semi-final.

On 20 September 1992, Meath won the championship following a 2–5 to 0–10 defeat of Armagh in the All-Ireland final. This was their 3rd All-Ireland title overall and their first in two championship seasons.

Results

Connacht Minor Football Championship

Preliminary Round

Quarter-Final

Semi-Finals

Final

Leinster Minor Football Championship

Preliminary Round

Quarter-Finals

Semi-Finals

Final

Munster Minor Football Championship

Quarter-Finals

Semi-Finals

Finals

Ulster Minor Football Championship

Quarter-Finals

Semi-Finals

Final

All-Ireland Minor Football Championship

Semi-Finals

Final

References

1992
All-Ireland Minor Football Championship